Myrmoteras binghamii is a species of ant in the subfamily Formicinae. It is found in Myanmar, and Thailand.

References

 https://www.itis.gov/servlet/SingleRpt/SingleRpt?search_topic=TSN&search_value=575175
 http://animaldiversity.org/accounts/Myrmoteras_binghamii/classification/

External links

 at antwiki.org

Formicinae
Hymenoptera of Asia
Insects described in 1893